Haastia is a genus of flowering plants in the daisy family, Asteraceae, native to New Zealand.

 Species
 Haastia × loganii Buchanan, hybrid of Leucogenes leontopodium × Raoulia rubra
 Haastia montana Buchanan
 Haastia pulvinaris Hook.f.
 Haastia recurva Hook.f.
 Haastia sinclairii Hook.f.
 formerly included
Haastia greenii Hook.f. - Synonym of Raoulia eximia Hook.f.

References

Senecioneae
Asteraceae genera
Endemic flora of New Zealand
Taxa named by Joseph Dalton Hooker